The Calloway County School District is located in Calloway County, Kentucky, United States and is the educational home to over 3000 students. The district operates a pre-school, three elementary schools, one middle school, and Calloway County High School.

Calloway County High School offers many elective courses and extra-curricular activities including FFA, Technology Students of America, Drama Club, Choir, and Band. Calloway were state championships in Fast Pitch Softball in 2004 and Regional Champions in Boys Track & Field in 2009.

Schools
Calloway County High School- Enrollment: 906
Calloway County Middle School-Enrollment: 739
East Calloway Elementary- Enrollment: 313
North Calloway Elementary- Enrollment: 617
Southwest Calloway Elementary- Enrollment: 429
Calloway County Preschool- Enrollment: 209

References

School districts in Kentucky
Education in Calloway County, Kentucky